The Zygocystinae are a subfamily of parasites in the phylum Apicomplexa.

Taxonomy

There are three genera in this subfamily: Adelphocystis, Pleurocystis and Zygocystis.

History

This family was created by Bhatia in 1930.

Description

Species in this subfamily infect worms of the family Lumbricidae.
 
In these genera syzygy occurs extremely early in the life cycle.

The oocyst is navicular or biconical and has unusual thickenings at both ends.

References

Conoidasida
Bikont subfamilies